

Explorations

Excavations
 Vere Gordon Childe completes excavations at Skara Brae (begun in 1927).
 John Garstang begins excavations at Jericho (continue to 1936).
 Francis Llewellyn Griffith excavates at Kawa (Sudan).
 Flinders Petrie begins excavations at Tall al-Ajjul (continue to 1934).

Finds
 August 5 - Remains of S. A. Andrée's Arctic Balloon Expedition of 1897 discovered.
 First fragments from an ancient boat harbour found on the bank of the Suojoki river in central Finland (one boat from site later dated to 13th century).

Publications
 Aleš Hrdlička - The Skeletal Remains of Early Man.

Miscellaneous
 September 11 - Max Mallowan marries Agatha Christie.
 Max von Oppenheim opens a private museum of his Near Eastern archaeological finds in Berlin.
 Edwin Smith Papyrus first translated.

Births
March 25 - John M. Coles, English prehistorian (d. 2020)
June 13 - Paul Veyne, French Roman archaeologist, historian
September 23 - Edda Bresciani, Italian Egyptologist (d. 2020)

See also
 List of years in archaeology
 1929 in archaeology
 1931 in archaeology

References

Archaeology
Archaeology
Archaeology by year